Tom Sorell (born 24 October 1951) is a Canadian philosopher based in the UK. His interests range from the theory of knowledge and the philosophy of science to early modern philosophy, ethics (including applied ethics) and political philosophy.  He is noted for his writings on Hobbes, scientism and applied ethics. Since 2008, he has worked in ethics and technology both as a researcher and as a consultant. He is the author of Hobbes (1986); Descartes (1987); Moral Theory and Capital Punishment (1987); Scientism (1992); Business Ethics (with John Hendry) (1994); Moral Theory and Anomaly (1999); Descartes Reinvented (2005); and Emergencies and Politics (2013).

Early life and education
Sorell was born in Mexico City in 1951 to European migrants. The family moved to Vancouver, Canada in 1956 and to Montreal in 1961. He attended the High School of Montreal, entered McGill University in 1968, and graduated in 1972, when he won the Prince of Wales Gold Medal in philosophy. In 1973, he started the BPhil in Philosophy at Balliol College, Oxford. He was taught by John McDowell, Gareth Evans, John Mackie, and Simon Blackburn. Supervised by B.F. McGuinness, he wrote a thesis on the deep continuity between Wittgenstein’s Tractatus and his very late work, On Certainty. After taking the BPhil, Sorell wrote a thesis under the supervision of David Pears expounding and defending a version of the causal theory of knowledge. He was awarded the Oxford DPhil in 1978.

Teaching career

Sorell held temporary lectureships at St. Anne's, Balliol, and Queen's Colleges in Oxford in the mid-1970s before joining the philosophy department at the Open University in 1979, working alongside Rosalind Hursthouse and Janet Radcliffe Richards. In 1992, he was appointed Reader in Philosophy at Essex University, and was promoted to Professor in 1996. From 2003-5 he acted as Co-Director of the Human Rights Centre at Essex. He moved to Birmingham University in 2006 as John Ferguson Professor of Global Ethics. In 2013 he became Professor of Politics and Philosophy at Warwick University, where he directs the Interdisciplinary Ethics Research Group. He was a Faculty Fellow in the Ethics and the Professions program at Harvard in 1996-7, and a visiting professor in philosophy at the Chinese University of Hong Kong in 2013.

Work
Sorell has published extensively in early modern philosophy, especially on Hobbes and Descartes, and has co-edited article collections on history of philosophy and analytic philosophy, on the relationship of canonical to non-canonical figures in early modern philosophy, and on the relationship between ancient and modern philosophers. He claims that history of philosophy and problem-solving analytic philosophy can be highly complementary. His Descartes Reinvented (2005) and Emergencies and Politics: A Sober Hobbesian Approach (2013) are applications of his views on how to harmonise the disciplines of problem-solving analytic philosophy and history of philosophy. His book Scientism: Philosophy and the Infatuation with Science (1991) articulates a pro-science position while criticising what  Sorell sees as a tendency, especially in American philosophy, to overvalue science and overdo naturalism. In ethics, Sorell defends theory against the claims of anti-theorists, including Bernard Williams. In applied ethics he has published on capital punishment, technology, including robotics and AI, surveillance, privacy, counter-terrorism, organised crime, emergency ethics including pandemic ethics, microfinance, and responsibility in the 2007-8 financial crisis. His latest work considers the various harms involved in several kinds of online crime and retaliation against online crime. His work in applied ethics is regularly pursued with practitioners: police, members of the intelligence services, technology developers, business people, medics, and policy makers.

Major publications
 with Dempsey, J and Cowton, C. eds. Business Ethics After the Financial Crisis (Routledge, 2019)
 with K. Kadjimatheou, J. Guelke eds. Security Ethics (Routledge, 2016)
 with L Cabera, eds. Microfinance, Rights and Global Justice (Cambridge University Press, 2015)
 Emergencies and Politics (Cambridge University Press, 2013)
 with Jill Kraye and John Rogers, eds. Scientia in Early Modern Philosophy (Springer, 2009).
 with Jill Kraye and John Rogers, eds. Insiders and Outsiders in Early Modern Philosophy (Routledge, 2009).
 Descartes Reinvented (Cambridge University Press, 2005).
 with John Rogers, eds. Analytic Philosophy and History of Philosophy (Oxford University Press, 2005).
 with L. Foisneau and J-C Merle, eds. Leviathan Between the Wars: Hobbes’s Impact on Early Twentieth Century Political Philosophy (Peter Lang, 2005).
 with L. Foisneau, eds. Leviathan After 350 Years (Oxford University Press, 2004).
 With John Rogers, eds. Hobbes and History (Routledge, 2000).
 ed. Descartes. Dartmouth Readings in the History of Philosophy (Ashgate, 1999).
 Moral Theory and Anomaly. Aristotelian Society Monograph Series (Blackwell, 1999).
 ed. Health Care, Ethics, and Insurance (Routledge, 1998).
 with R. Ariew, J. Cottingham, eds. and trans. Descartes: Background Source Materials (Cambridge University Press, 1998).
 ed. The Cambridge Companion to Hobbes, 3rd edn (Cambridge University Press, 1996).
 ed. The Rise of Modern Philosophy (Oxford University Press, 1993).
 Descartes (Oxford University Press, 1987) [repr. in the Oxford Past Masters and Very Short Introductions series, and widely translated].

References

1951 births
20th-century Canadian philosophers
21st-century Canadian philosophers
McGill University alumni
Alumni of Balliol College, Oxford
Descartes scholars
Hobbes scholars
Living people